Frozenbyte Inc. is a Finnish video game developer founded in 2001 and based in Helsinki.  it had approximately 130 employees. Frozenbyte's first commercial game was Shadowgrounds for Microsoft Windows. Both Shadowgrounds and its follow-up Shadowgrounds: Survivor were released for Linux in 2009, ported by IGIOS and published by Linux Game Publishing.

Frozenbyte's next commercial game, Trine was released in 2009 for Microsoft Windows in 2009, and has since been ported to Linux, OS X, the PlayStation Network, and Nintendo eShop. The game spawned 2 sequels, Trine 2 which was released on Microsoft Windows, OS X, PlayStation 3, and Xbox 360 in December 2011, Linux in March 2012, and Wii U eShop in November 2012, and Trine 3: The Artifacts of Power which was released via Steam Early access in August 2015. A fourth installment, Trine 4: The Nightmare Prince was released in October 2019.

A Humble Indie Bundle sale started on 12 April 2011, and featured five games from Frozenbyte, including Trine, Shadowgrounds, and Shadowgrounds: Survivor, for Microsoft Windows, Mac OS X, and Linux. It also contained an executable version along with source code for an unfinished game, Jack Claw, and a pre-order for their upcoming game, Splot. As of August 2021, Splot has still to be published, and buyer's libraries on Humble Bundle say "There are no full release builds planned of Splot for Windows, Mac, and Linux".

On 4 December 2015, the company announced Shadwen, a stealth game where time moves only when the player moves.

On 28 May 2019, the company announced a new upcoming game Starbase, a Sci-FI MMO that was allegedly in development in secret for 5 years prior.

Games developed
Shadowgrounds (2005)
Shadowgrounds: Survivor (2007)
Trine (2009)
Trine 2 (2011)
Splot (2014)
Trine 3: The Artifacts of Power (2015)
Shadwen (2016)
 Has-Been Heroes (2017)
 Nine Parchments (2017)
Trine 4: The Nightmare Prince (2019)
Starbase (2021)

References

External links

Frozenbyte Official website

Privately held companies of Finland
Video game companies established in 2001
2001 establishments in Finland
Companies based in Helsinki
Video game companies of Finland
Video game development companies